Streptomyces mexicanus is a xylanolytic and thermophilic bacterium species from the genus of Streptomyces which has been isolated from soil from a sugar cane field in Mexico. Streptomyces mexicanus produces xylanase and B-xylosidase.

See also 
 List of Streptomyces species

References

Further reading

External links
Type strain of Streptomyces mexicanus at BacDive -  the Bacterial Diversity Metadatabase

mexicanus
Bacteria described in 2003